Metrojet Flight 9268 was an international chartered passenger flight, operated by Russian airline Kogalymavia (branded as Metrojet). On 31 October 2015, at 06:13 local time EST (04:13 UTC), an Airbus A321-231 operating the flight exploded above the northern Sinai Peninsula following its departure from Sharm El Sheikh International Airport, Egypt en route to Pulkovo Airport, Saint Petersburg, Russia. All 224 passengers and crew on board were killed. The cause of the crash was most likely an onboard explosive device as concluded by Russian investigators.

Most of the people aboard the flight were tourists. There were 212 Russians, four Ukrainians, and one Belarusian passenger. There were also 7 crew members on board all of whom were Russian. Investigators believe that a bomb was put on the aircraft at Sharm El Sheikh, with the goal of causing airlines to suspend flights to that airport.

Shortly after the crash, the Islamic State's Sinai Branch, previously known as Ansar Bait al-Maqdis, claimed responsibility for the incident, which occurred in the vicinity of the Sinai insurgency. ISIL claimed responsibility on Twitter, on video, and in a statement by Abu Osama al-Masri, the leader of the group's Sinai branch. ISIL posted pictures of what it said was the bomb in Dabiq, its online magazine.

By 4 November 2015, British and American authorities suspected that a bomb was responsible for the crash. On 8 November 2015, an anonymous member of the Egyptian investigation team said the investigators were "90 percent sure" that the jet was brought down by a bomb. Lead investigator Ayman al-Muqaddam said that other possible causes of the crash included a fuel explosion, metal fatigue, and lithium batteries overheating. The Russians said they had found explosive residue as evidence. On 24 February 2016, Egyptian President Abdel Fattah el-Sisi acknowledged that terrorism caused the crash.

In March 2020, an Egyptian appeals court ruled the crash was not an act of terrorism, and it dismissed lawsuits against government officials, Metrojet and Ingosstrakh. The appeals court ruled that the identities of the 224 victims had not been officially established and it was impossible to issue compensation to them as a result.

Aircraft

The aircraft was an 18-year-old Airbus A321-231, serial number 663. It first flew on 9 May 1997 and was delivered new to Middle East Airlines on 27 May 1997 with registration F-OHMP. In 2003, it was leased by Onur Air and, beginning in 2007, it was subleased to Saudi Arabian Airlines and other carriers and was registered as TC-OAE. In April 2012, Kolavia acquired the aircraft with a new registration of EI-ETJ and transferred it to Kogalymavia in May.

On 16 November 2001, while operating Middle East Airlines Flight 304, the aircraft suffered a tailstrike while landing in Cairo, Egypt. Neither the crew nor the passengers were injured, but the damage was severe. Within three months, the aircraft was repaired and returned to service.

At the time of the crash, the aircraft was owned by Dublin-based AerCap and leased to Kolavia. The aircraft had accumulated 56,000 flight hours on nearly 21,000 flights.

Passengers and crew

Flight 9268 was carrying 217 passengers, of which 25 were children, plus seven crew members. The captain of the flight was 47-year-old Valery Yurievich Nemov and the first officer was Sergei Stanislavovich Trukhachev. According to the airline, captain Nemov had amassed more than 12,000 hours of flight time, including 3,800 hours on this aircraft type. First officer Trukhachev had 5,641 hours of flight time, including more than 1,300 hours on the aircraft type.

The Russian embassy confirmed that most of the passengers and all of the crew members were Russian. There were also one Belarusian and four Ukrainian passengers on board. Most of the passengers were tourists returning from Red Sea resorts. The Association of Tour Operators of Russia released the passenger manifest of all those thought to have been on the flight. The majority of the passengers were from northwest Russia, including Saint Petersburg and the surrounding Leningrad, Novgorod and Pskov oblasts. A great number of children were orphaned by the crash as many parents on the flight had left their children behind in Russia.

Crash

Flight 9268 left Sharm El Sheikh airport at 05:50 EST (03:50 UTC) for Pulkovo Airport in Saint Petersburg, Russia, with 217 passengers and seven crew members on board. The aircraft failed to make contact with Cyprus Air Traffic Control 23 minutes later.

The Islamic State's Sinai branch said in a statement the same day that it had brought down the airliner. Wassim Nasr, France 24's expert on jihadi movements, said that the IS group has never claimed an attack they did not commit. Russian media outlets claimed that the pilot reported technical problems and had requested a landing at the nearest airport before the A321 went missing. This claim was disputed by other sources, including the Egyptian authorities, and subsequent analysis of the flight recorder data confirmed that this was false. A bomb exploded in the aircraft, causing uncontrolled decompression, and the aircraft disintegrated in mid-air. All 224 passengers and crew died.

Reuters quoted an unnamed security officer as saying that the aircraft had been completely destroyed. Aerial images of the wreckage broadcast on RT indicated that the wings were intact until impact. The debris pattern, combined with an initial interpretation of the aircraft's abrupt changes in altitude and airspeed, reinforced the presumption that the aircraft's tail separated during flight and fell separately.

Response
Egyptian authorities reached the wreckage within hours. Fifty ambulances were sent to the crash site near Housna,  from Sharm El Sheikh. Unnamed Egyptian officials reported that the aircraft "split in two" and most bodies were found strapped to their seats. Initial reports indicated that voices of trapped passengers could be heard in a section of the crashed aircraft. At least 100 bodies were initially found, including at least five children.

Investigation
Ayman al-Muqaddam, the head of the central air traffic accident authority in Egypt, was appointed to investigate the cause of the crash. In a statement on 31 October, he indicated that the pilot had made contact with the civil aviation authorities and asked to land at the nearest airport. He suggested the aircraft may have been attempting an emergency landing at El Arish International Airport in northern Sinai. On the same day, Egyptian Civil Aviation Minister Hossam Kamel said that air traffic control recordings did not show any distress calls, nor change of route requests by the pilots. The President of Egypt, Abdel Fattah el-Sisi, said that a probe of the crash would take months. Furthermore, on 31 October the International Charter on Space and Major Disasters was activated, providing for the humanitarian retasking of satellite assets.

The Russian Ministry of Emergency Situations sent three of its aircraft to the crash site. The Investigative Committee of Russia also started a legal case against Kogalymavia under legislation regulating "violation of rules of flights and preparations." Kogalymavia's employees were also  questioned, along with those of the Brisco tour agency that had chartered the flight. Egyptian Foreign Minister Sameh Shoukry promised to work closely with Russian officials and investigators to find the cause of the accident. The aircraft had passed technical checks before taking off. Investigators would also view the security camera footage. Soon after the crash, Russia's regional transport prosecutors determined that the quality of fuel on the aircraft met required standards.

The aviation accident investigation agencies BEA (France), BFU (Germany), and AAIU (Ireland) participated in the investigation as representatives for the state of the aircraft's design, manufacture, and registration respectively. The BEA sent two investigators, accompanied by six representatives from Airbus, to Egypt on 1 November. According to the BEA, they joined two investigators from the BFU and four investigators from the Interstate Aviation Committee, their Russian counterpart, representing the state of the aircraft's operator.

Both the flight data recorder and the cockpit voice recorder were recovered from the crash site on 1 November. Russian Transport Minister Maksim Sokolov and a team of specialist investigators arrived in Cairo to assist the Egyptian investigators in determining the cause of the crash. The flight data recorders were reported to be in good condition. On 4 November, Egypt's Civil Aviation Ministry Investigators reported that the cockpit voice recorder (CVR) was partially damaged and much work was required to extract data from it. The CVR indicated that everything was normal until a sudden disastrous event. An explosion or other sudden loud noise was heard very shortly before the recorder stopped recording.

The Egyptian search and rescue team had found 163 bodies by 1 November.

An unnamed official quoted by Reuters said that Flight 9268's tail section separated from the main body of the fuselage and was burning, which could indicate an explosion. According to a senior US defence official speaking on 2 November, a US infrared satellite detected a heat flash at the time and place of the disaster, and the US intelligence community believed that it could have been an explosion on the aircraft, by either a fuel tank or a bomb and the satellite imagery also ruled out a missile attack. US Director of National Intelligence James Clapper said that there was not yet any "direct evidence of terrorist involvement". Some UK news outlets reported that an ISIL bomb was the most likely explanation for the crash.

Within a week of the crash, serious considerations were given to the notion that the plane had been intentionally brought down. The UK government said that in the light of further British intelligence, the crash "may well have been caused by an explosive device". British aviation experts travelled to Egypt to assess airport security; the UK government Cobra emergency committee, chaired by the Prime Minister, considered their findings. The BBC reported that the British government thinks the incident was probably caused by terrorism based on intercepted transmissions between militants based in Sinai. These transmissions suggest that a bomb was put in the hold prior to takeoff. Although the British have not ruled out a technical fault, the BBC reports that is "increasingly unlikely". Paul Adams, BBC world affairs correspondent, said that Prime Minister David Cameron's spokesperson left little doubt that the British government believed the aircraft was brought down by a bomb. Adams said that suspending flights both to and from a foreign country and insisting on your own technical experts assessing security demonstrated a lack of confidence in that country's own security measures.

At the same time, flights began to be stopped from and to Sharm El Sheikh in Egypt, causing around 20,000 British tourists to be stranded.

European investigators had found that the cockpit voice recorder data is consistent with an explosion and the flight data recorder cuts off abruptly. On 8 November, Reuters quoted an unnamed Egyptian investigation team member, speaking anonymously because of the sensitivity of the investigation, who said he was "90% sure" the airliner was brought down by a bomb, based on an initial analysis of the last second of the cockpit voice recording. Lead investigator Ayman al-Muqaddam said that other causes, such as lithium batteries overheating, a fuel explosion, or metal fatigue in the structure, still needed to be definitively ruled out.

On 17 November 2015, the Russian security service chief Alexander Bortnikov announced that their investigation had concluded that a "terror act" brought down Metrojet Flight 9268 after traces of explosives were found in the wreckage. Spectral analysis was used among other methods to examine the substance found. According to Russian officials, an improvised explosive device with power equivalent to up to 1 kilogram of TNT brought down the flight. Russia offered a US$50 million reward for further information. Reuters reported that, according to security sources, two employees of Egypt's Sharm El Sheikh airport had been detained for questioning over the crash on suspicion of putting a bomb on board the flight. Egyptian authorities denied this.

On 18 November 2015, ISIL published pictures of what it claimed was the type of bomb in its Dabiq online magazine, claiming to show the three IED components including a Schweppes soda can containing the explosive charge, a military-grade detonator and switch. In the same month Russian Defense Minister Sergey Shoygu announced that the Sinai branch of ISIL was responsible for downing of the flight.

On 14 December 2015 the Egyptian committee investigating the crash issued a preliminary report. The leader of the committee said that it had so far found "no evidence that there is an act of terror or illegal intervention". In response to the statement by the investigating committee, Russian spokesman Dmitry Peskov re-iterated that "our experts concluded this was a terrorist attack".

On 29 January 2016 Reuters reported, from an unnamed source, that a mechanic had been detained and was suspected of planting a bomb, which he had been given by his cousin, who was a member of ISIS. Two policemen and a baggage-handler were suspected of helping the mechanic.

On 24 February 2016, Egyptian President Abdel Fattah el-Sisi acknowledged that terrorism caused the crash, saying, "Has terrorism ended? No... Whoever downed that plane, what did he want? Just to hit tourism? No. To hit relations. To hit relations with Russia."

Other hypotheses

Tailstrike and maintenance hypotheses
Airline officials have announced that they have ruled out mechanical failure, but investigators have still not made such a determination. Natalya Trukhacheva, the ex-wife of co-pilot Sergei Trukhachev, said in an interview with NTV that her ex-husband had complained to their daughter about the aircraft's technical state.

The aircraft involved in the crash had suffered a tailstrike while landing in Cairo 14 years earlier.  Some have drawn comparisons to Japan Airlines Flight 123, which crashed into a mountain in 1985, 7 years after the aircraft had suffered a tailstrike while landing. Flight 123 suffered catastrophic damage in mid-air while climbing to its cruising altitude. The crash of Flight 123 was caused by an incorrect repair of the aircraft's tail section following the tailstrike, which left the rear pressure bulkhead of the airliner vulnerable to metal fatigue and ultimately resulted in explosive decompression. Reports on the wreckage of Flight 9268 have suggested that a "clear break" occurred near the plane's rear pressure bulkhead, possibly indicating failure of the bulkhead.

On 2 November, Metrojet spokesman Alexander Smirnov insisted that the aircraft was 100% airworthy and that its crew was "very experienced", showing certificates the airline had received in 2014, later adding that the tailstrike incident in Cairo had been fully repaired and the engines had been inspected on 26 October, five days before the crash.

Missile hypothesis
In a report by UK newspaper The Guardian, a missile attack was "deemed unlikely" but the report stated that several airlines would avoid flying over Sinai while the crash was under investigation. On 2 November, Metrojet spokesman Alexander Smirnov ruled out technical fault and pilot error as the cause of the crash and blamed an "external force". ISIL's Wilayah Sinai claimed the incident was in revenge for Russian air strikes against militants in Syria, where IS controls territories, along with contiguous Iraqi territories. Wilayah Sinai was said not to have access to surface-to-air missiles capable of hitting an aircraft at high altitude since man-portable air-defence systems (MANPADS) can rarely reach even half the cruising altitude of an airliner, but analysts could not exclude the possibility of a bomb on board the flight.

Egyptian Army spokesman Mohamed Samir rebutted the claims and pointed out that the investigation was ongoing. Russian Transport Minister Maksim Sokolov dismissed the claims as "fabrications" due to a lack of evidence from Egyptian civil aviation, from security officials and from air traffic data. James Clapper, United States Director of National Intelligence, said on 2 November that there was no evidence yet of terrorist involvement but that he would not rule it out.  On the same day, a source on the committee analysing the flight recorders said he believed that the aircraft was not struck from the outside and that the pilot did not make a distress signal before it disappeared from radar. He based his comments on the preliminary investigation of both flight recorders.

Disruption to air traffic
All flights due to leave Sharm El Sheikh for Britain were delayed as a "precautionary measure" to allow experts to assess security. Emirates, Lufthansa and Air France–KLM announced they would avoid overflying the Sinai peninsula until the cause of the accident has been determined. The United States' Federal Aviation Administration had previously told carriers under its jurisdiction to operate above FL260 (26,000 feet [7,900 m]) while flying over Sinai. Germany's Luftfahrt-Bundesamt had told its airlines the same thing. Air Arabia, Flydubai and British Airways also stopped their flights over the Sinai Peninsula in response to the crash. The latter stated that they planned to continue flights over Sinai, although the intended alternative route was not announced. EasyJet initially stated that they would not halt their flights to and from Sharm El Sheikh and Hurghada, but would actively review them; passengers who opted not to fly the route would be re-booked on another flight or given a flight voucher.

On 4 November, the British Foreign and Commonwealth Office (FCO) changed their travel advice to advise against all but essential travel by air to Sharm El Sheikh. As a result, all British flights to and from the resort were cancelled from 4  November. On the same day, the Irish Aviation Authority (IAA) issued an order to all Irish airline operators not to operate to or from Sharm el‐Sheikh or fly over the Sinai Peninsula until further notice.

The decisions on 4 November by the British and Irish authorities to ground flights to and from Sharm El Sheikh came within minutes of each other. Patrick McLoughlin – UK Secretary of State for Transport – told Parliament that Ireland had investigators from the Air Accident Investigation Unit (AAIU) on the ground in Egypt reporting back to the Irish government, and the British and Irish governments have close security co-operation.

On the morning of 5 November Air France-KLM announced that it would not allow hold baggage on its flight out from Cairo that day; over half of the booked passengers refused to fly. There were an estimated 20,000 British citizens in Sharm El Sheikh on 5 November, almost half of whom were on holiday and stranded by the cancellation of flights. Flights to the UK were allowed again from 6 November, to enable people to travel home, but with restrictions and increased security measures. Passengers were permitted to travel home with only hand luggage, with hold luggage to be returned following a more stringent screening process. British officials at the airport provided extra security and approved aircraft as safe to travel.

Russian President Vladimir Putin announced on 6 November that all Russian flights to and from Egypt were cancelled. Most British airlines serving the resort sent repatriation flights out to the resort to bring stranded British tourists back to the United Kingdom. On the afternoon of 6 November, Egyptian authorities placed restrictions on the number of flights due to overcrowding in the terminals; as a result, only eight of the planned 29 repatriation flights were able to leave on the day with various flights forced to divert or return to the UK whilst in the air.

By 8 November about 11,000 Russian tourists and about 5,300 British tourists had been flown back from the resort.

On 9 November, British airlines announced that all flights to the resort had been cancelled until at least 25 November. The British government and head of Emirates Airlines stated that airport security throughout the Middle East could be significantly overhauled as a result of the bombing. By 15 November, 16,000 British tourists had been flown back from the resort since the suspension of flights.

Aftermath 
In March 2016, Metrojet filed for bankruptcy as a result of the bombing of Flight 9268 and the security situation in Egypt, both of which resulted in a subsequent fall in passenger numbers.

On 12 April 2018, flights between Russia and Egypt finally resumed. The flights, which are operated by both Aeroflot and EgyptAir, currently operate only between Moscow and Cairo.

Airports around the world tightened the security vetting for staff. About 70 employees lost their clearance to work in secure zones of Paris's Orly and Charles de Gaulle airports due to suspected extremist links.

On 8 August 2021, Russia removed its ban on flights to Egypt's resort cities.

International reactions

Russia
On 1 November 2015, the Government of Russia grounded all the A321 aircraft flown by Kogalymavia. The Russian news agency Interfax reported that the Russian transport regulator, Rostransnadzor, had requested Kogalymavia to stop flying its A321 aircraft until the cause(s) of the crash had been identified.

Maria Zakharova, a spokeswoman for the Russian Foreign Ministry, stated that the Russian Embassy was following the events. President Putin declared 1 November to be a national day of mourning in Russia.

Dmitry Kiselyov, a Soviet and Russian journalist, blamed the crash on an alleged secret pact between America and ISIL.

Initially representatives of the Russian government claimed that "there is not the slightest evidence" for a terrorist attack and especially denied any links between the crash and Russian intervention in Syria. On 17 November Russia's security chief said the cause of the attack was an act of terror, and the Russian Government offered a US$50 million reward for any information leading to the arrest of the perpetrators.

Egypt
Hours after the crash, Egyptian Prime Minister Sherif Ismail was on his way to the crash site along with other ministers on a private jet, according to the Tourism Ministry.

Ireland
The Republic of Ireland, as the state of aircraft registry, made an offer of assistance which was accepted by the Egyptian accident investigation authorities for the Irish Air Accident Investigation Unit (AAIU) of the Department of Transport, Tourism and Sport to send a team consisting of an Operations/Pilot Inspector, an Engineering Inspector and a Regulatory/Operations Adviser from the Irish Aviation Authority (IAA) to assist in the investigation. The team flew out on an Irish military aircraft on 2 November.

Israel
Israel, which borders the Sinai peninsula, offered to assist Russia and Egypt with surveillance if needed.

Ukraine 
In April 2018, Ukrainian foreign minister Pavlo Klimkin visited Cairo to discuss the bombing, and its effects. Since the travel ban had been lifted earlier the same year, Ukraine International Airlines launched direct flights between Kyiv and Cairo on 9 April, though there are claims that the airline only resumed flights.

United Kingdom
On 4 November British intelligence agencies became involved in the investigation. The UK government sent extra consular staff and half a dozen military planners to Egypt. Egyptian President al-Sisi met then British Prime Minister Cameron in London. At a joint press conference with Cameron, President Sisi said Egypt would co-operate on improved security measures at Sharm El Sheikh airport. Cameron and Russian President Putin also discussed the investigation into the crash. On 5 November, the government sent diplomatic staff including British embassy staff and FCO Rapid Deployment Teams to Sharm El Sheikh airport to help British nationals home.

Less than a week after the crash, the UK banned flights into Sharm El-Sheikh airport; the restriction lasted until October of 2019. As of 5 November 2017, the UK government was also advising against "all but essential" travel to the South Sinai "with the exception of the area within the Sharm el Sheikh perimeter barrier, which includes the airport and the areas of Sharm el Maya, Hadaba, Naama Bay, Sharks Bay and Nabq". Since flights from other countries were continuing, the UK government reminded its citizens of its ongoing recommendation against all but essential travel by air to or from Sharm el Sheikh.

United States
US President Barack Obama stated, on 5 November, that the US government was taking the incident "very seriously", knowing there was a possibility that there had been a bomb on board the flight.

Airbus
Airbus announced they would issue more information when it became available. They also released a statement on their website confirming the aircraft's MSN and engine configuration.

Charlie Hebdo
On 6 November, the French satirical weekly magazine Charlie Hebdo published cartoons referring to the tragedy, one with pieces of an aircraft falling on an ISIL fighter with the caption: "Russia's air force intensifies its bombing." The cartoon was considered offensive in Russia and a spokesman for President Vladimir Putin called the artwork "sacrilege", and members of the State Duma called for the magazine to be banned as extremist literature and demanded an apology from the French government.

See also
 Accidents and incidents involving the Airbus A320 family
 List of accidents and incidents involving commercial aircraft
 List of massacres in Egypt
 Air India Flight 182
 Avianca Flight 203
 Continental Airlines Flight 11
 Iraqi Airways Flight 163
 Itavia Flight 870
 Pan Am Flight 103
 UTA Flight 772
 Air Lanka Flight 512

References
Informational notes

Citations

External links

 Accident record
 Информация по рейсу 7К-9268 – Archived copy of Metrojet's crisis page regarding Flight 9268 
 А-321 EI-ETJ 31.10.2015 – Interstate Aviation Committee 
 Information from the Egyptian Ministry of Civil Aviation 
 Interim statement
 Crisis  – Airbus page about the incident
 Accident in the Sinai Peninsula (Egypt) – BEA
 Aircraft info and flight history – Flightradar24
 List of passengers  

2015 in Egypt
2015 in Russia
Airliner bombings
Aviation history of Russia
Aviation accidents and incidents in 2015
Aviation accidents and incidents in Egypt
Accidents and incidents involving the Airbus A321
Belarusian people murdered abroad
Egypt–Russia relations
History of Sharm El Sheikh
ISIL terrorist incidents in Egypt
9268
Mass murder in Egypt
Mass murder in 2015
Sinai insurgency
Russian people murdered abroad
Terrorist incidents in Egypt in 2015
Russian involvement in the Syrian civil war
October 2015 crimes in Africa
Ukrainian people murdered abroad
October 2015 events in Egypt